The purple-headed starling (Hylopsar purpureiceps), also known as the purple-headed glossy-starling, is a species of starling in the family Sturnidae.

Distribution and habitat
It is found in Angola, Benin, Cameroon, Central African Republic, Republic of the Congo, Democratic Republic of the Congo, Ivory Coast, Equatorial Guinea, Gabon, Guinea, Malawi, Nigeria, and Uganda.

References

purple-headed starling
Birds of Central Africa
Birds of West Africa
purple-headed starling
Taxonomy articles created by Polbot